Schmidtke is a German surname.

Geographical distribution
As of 2014, 78.5% of all known bearers of the surname Schmidtke were residents of Germany, 11.7% of the United States, 2.5% of Canada, 1.9% of Poland, 1.5% of Brazil and 1.2% of Australia.

In Germany, the frequency of the surname was higher than national average in the following states:
 1. Schleswig-Holstein (1:2,312)
 2. Mecklenburg-Vorpommern (1:3,037)
 3. Brandenburg (1:3,186)
 4. Hamburg (1:3,940)
 5. Saxony-Anhalt (1:4,903)
 6. Lower Saxony (1:4,946)
 7. Bremen (1:5,030)
 8. North Rhine-Westphalia (1:5,253)

People
 Alfred Schmidtke (1870s–?) German New Testament researcher
 Claudia Schmidtke (born 1966), German cardiologist and politician
 Fredy Schmidtke (1961–2017), German track cyclist
 Heinz Schmidtke (1925–2013), German ergonomist
 Ned Schmidtke (born 1942), American film and television actor
 Rosemarie Schmidtke, German rower
 Sabine Schmidtke, Islamic scholar from Germany

References

German-language surnames